was Commander-in-Chief of the Army (陸軍奉行並) under the Minister of the Army Katsu Kaishū, during the Bakumatsu period of Japanese history, and later became vice-president (Japanese:副総裁) of the Republic of Ezo during the Boshin War. He was particularly in charge of Internal Affairs and Foreign Relations.

1839 births
1909 deaths
Hatamoto
Japanese politicians
Japanese military leaders
Matsudaira clan
Samurai